Thomas Methven is a former association football player who represented New Zealand at international level.

Methven played three official A-international matches for New Zealand in 1948, all against visiting trans-Tasman neighbours Australia, the first a 0–7 loss on 28 August, followed by 0-4 and 1-8 losses on 4 September and 9 September respectively.

References 

Year of birth missing (living people)
Living people
New Zealand association footballers
New Zealand international footballers
Association footballers not categorized by position